Root Magic is a children novel by Eden Royce. It is her novel-length debut set in South Carolina. The first edition was published by Walden Pond Press an imprint of HarperCollins in 2021.

References 

2021 American novels
American historical fiction
HarperCollins books